Thomas Wessinghage (born 22 February 1952 in Hagen, North Rhine-Westphalia) is a German former middle- and long-distance runner who won the 1982 European Championships' final over 5000 metres beating the British world-record holder David Moorcroft. Because he was already thirty at the time, and had been an international-level runner for a decade, this victory was a long-awaited one for him.  He admitted that he decided to run the 5,000 metres instead of the 1,500 metres, because he lost to Ovett and Coe so often in the shorter distance. The fairly slow pace of the 1982 European Athletics Championships 5,000-metre final favoured Wessinghage, because he was in top form - having set a European record at 2,000 metres shortly before the Championships - and because he was the fastest 1,500-metre runner in the final, having run that distance in 3 minutes 31.6 seconds in 1980. Shortly after he started his final sprint with over 250 metres to go, Wessinghage moved into a decisive lead, stretching it into five metres by 4,800 metres and almost doubling it by 4,900 metres (see, for example, "The Thousand Stars of Athletics" / Yleisurheilun tuhat tähteä, written by Matti Hannus and published in Finland in 1983; Pat Butcher, The Perfect Distance: Ovett&Coe: The Record-Breaking Rivalry, London:  Weidenfeld&Nicolson, 2004; "The Major Events of Top Sports Until 1982" / Huippu-urheilun suuret tapahtumat vuoteen 1982 asti, published in Finland in 1982; "The Great European Championships Book" / Suuri EM-kirja, published in Finland in 1990;  see tommytempo1's video about the race's last two laps on YouTube with the search words "Thomas Wessinghage").

In 1980 he set a German record of 3:31.58 min over 1500 metres which still has not been broken. In the same race Steve Ovett from the UK set a world record of 3:31.36 min. He was married to former Olympian Ellen Tittel. Wessinghage missed a great chance of winning an Olympic medal that year because West Germany joined the United States-led boycott. He was unlucky also in the other Olympic years of his competitive career: he was eliminated in the 1,500-metre heats in the 1972 and 1976 Olympics, and he got injured in a race before the 1984 Olympics (see Hannus, "The Thousand Stars of Athletics";  "The Big Olympic Book" / Suuri Olympiakirja, written and published by the "Runner" / Juoksija magazine's journalists and published in Finland in 1984).

In the 1983 inaugural World Athletics Championships, he was among the favourites to win the 5,000-metre title, but for some reason
he could not accelerate enough when it mattered the most - during the final lap - despite running at a steady rhythm earlier in the race.  Accordingly, he dropped from third to sixth during the last lap, and lost to the winner, Ireland's Eamonn Coghlan, by almost four seconds (see, for example, "World Athletics Championships 1983" / Yleisurheilun MM-kisat 1983, written by the "Runner" / Juoksija magazine's journalists and published in Finland in 1983).

His last major competitive race was in the 5,000-metre qualifying heats of the 1986 European Athletics Championships in Stuttgart,
West Germany. In that race, he failed to advance to the final (see, for example, "The Great European Championships Book" / Suuri EM-kirja, published in Finland in 1990).

International competitions

1Did not finish in the final
2Representing Europe

External links

1952 births
Living people
Sportspeople from Hagen
German male middle-distance runners
German male long-distance runners
Athletes (track and field) at the 1972 Summer Olympics
Athletes (track and field) at the 1976 Summer Olympics
Olympic athletes of West Germany
European Athletics Championships medalists
World Athletics Championships athletes for West Germany
Universiade medalists in athletics (track and field)
Universiade gold medalists for West Germany
Medalists at the 1975 Summer Universiade